Winfrey "Wimp" Sanderson (born August 8, 1937) is a retired American college basketball coach. He coached at the University of Alabama from 1981 to 1992 and the University of Arkansas at Little Rock from 1994 to 1999.

Sanderson was born in Florence, Alabama. He prepped at Coffee High School and graduated from Florence State College, now known as the University of North Alabama, in 1959. In 1960 he became a graduate assistant under Hayden Riley at Alabama, and in 1961 he was made a full-time assistant. He served in this capacity for 20 years under both Riley and C. M. Newton, eventually becoming Newton's top assistant.  When Newton resigned to become assistant commissioner of the Southeastern Conference, Sanderson was named his successor.  In 12 years as head coach his teams averaged 21.8 wins a year, with a 267–119 record, and they won 5 SEC tournaments. They played in one NIT and ten NCAA tournaments making the Sweet 16 six times. He is only coach in Alabama history to win 200 or more games in his first 10 years. He was the Southeastern Conference Coach of the Year in 1987, 1989 and 1990, and was the National Coach of the Year in 1987.

Sanderson was known for wearing plaid sport jackets on the sidelines. During his tenure at Alabama, the Coleman Coliseum was known as the "Plaid Palace" (with its midcourt logo painted crimson-and-white plaid), the Million Dollar Band was known as the "Plaid Players", and many fans came to games wearing plaid in Sanderson's honor.

Early life and playing career
Winfrey Sanderson was named for his uncle, Hayes Winfrey, who died from kidney problems in his twenties after he blocked a punt in his stomach during a high school football game.

His father, who worked for an auto parts company, died when he was six, and Sanderson, an only child, shared an apartment with his mother, Christine, a secretary for the Veterans Administration. During his senior year in high school, he became class president.

In 1955, Sanderson went to Abilene Christian College to play basketball. He planned to go into radio and television, but flunking Spanish soured his plans. He transferred home to Florence State (now the University of North Alabama) and continued his hoops career while graduating in physical education. He took a high school head coaching job in Carbon Hill, Alabama and one year later, in 1959–60, he went to Alabama as a graduate assistant under Hayden Riley for $75 a month. Sanderson figured it was a stepping stone for a better high school job.

"When he was hired, Wimp felt a tremendous amount of pressure", said his wife, Annette. "He had his doubters. People wondered, 'Why did they ever hire Wimp?'"

Sanderson played his freshman season of college basketball at Abilene Christian before transferring back to Florence State. In three seasons with the Lions, from 1957 to 1959, he scored 1,076 points and averaged 14.9 points over his 72-game career. He was named team captain as both a junior and a senior and led the Lions in scoring in 1958 with 403 points. His best single-game performance came against Jacksonville State University in 1958 when he scored 31 points. Sanderson graduated in 1959.

Coaching career

Alabama
Before he resigned in 1992, Sanderson had been at Alabama for 32 years—one year as a graduate assistant, 20 as a full-time assistant and 12 as head coach. He led the Crimson Tide to 10 NCAA Tournaments and six trips to the Sweet 16. He lived 32 of his 58 years in Tuscaloosa, watching three decades of history pass from one season to another. In 1963, as Governor George Wallace stood at the schoolhouse door, Sanderson, an assistant coach without political convictions, watched from a window in a building across the street, unaware he was privy to history. Six years later, as Alabama Coach C.M. Newton became the first Southeastern Conference coach to heavily recruit African-Americans (Vanderbilt's Perry Wallace was the first African-American to play in the conference, in 1967-68), Sanderson was pounding the recruiting trail, helping to lure players like future All-American Wendell Hudson to Tuscaloosa.

"I have a lot of respect for C.M. and Wimp," says Hudson, the first African-American athlete at Alabama and now the assistant AD at Alabama. "I would talk to a lot of guys who came in the league at the same time as I did, who didn't have as easy of a time as I did. There were no special rules. Everyone was treated equally."

Sanderson's skills as a recruiter were legendary. Enticing Robert Horry, Derrick McKey and Latrell Sprewell to football-mad Tuscaloosa was considered remarkable. In addition to Sprewell, Horry and McKey, eight other players recruited when Sanderson was head coach made it to the NBA, including James Robinson and David Benoit.

Scandal and resignation
Sanderson resigned from Alabama on May 18, 1992, days after Nancy Watts, his longtime secretary, filed a sexual discrimination lawsuit against him and the university with the US Equal Opportunity Commission. Both Sanderson and Watts admitted they had had an affair from about 1970 to 1985, but both offered conflicting stories about what happened on March 17, 1992. Watts said that on that day, two days before Alabama was to play Stanford in the NCAA tournament, Sanderson punched her in the face during an argument, giving her a black eye. Sanderson said Watts had become hysterical and that, in an effort to defend himself, he extended his hand and she collided with it, resulting in the injury. More than a year later, Watts' lawsuit against Sanderson, the university and then-athletic director Hootie Ingram, was settled out of court, days before it was scheduled to go to trial. 

Alabama and Sanderson's homeowner's insurance policy paid Watts $275,000. Sanderson's employment with the university ended after 32 years. "It was a situation where if you're accused of anything, you're guilty, and that's not right. I know what happened," Sanderson has said. "I gave the university 32 years, all I could give them. Tried to do everything the right way. It was a sad day in my life. I loved the school, but it's behind me. It's over."

David Hobbs, a former assistant, was promoted as head coach when Sanderson resigned. Mark Gottfried, a former player under Sanderson, followed Hobbs and coached for 10-1/2 seasons before he was fired on January 26, 2009.

Arkansas–Little Rock
Sanderson resurfaced in 1994 at the University of Arkansas at Little Rock. He was the Trojans' coach when they appeared in the National Invitation Tournament in 1996.

Personal life
 Sanderson currently resides in Birmingham, Alabama.

Awards
Named SEC Coach of the Decade for the 1980s by the Lexington Herald-Leader
1987, 1989 and 1990 SEC Coach of the Year
1987 National Coach of the Year
Inducted into the Alabama Sports Hall of Fame in 1990
UNA Alumnus of the Year in 1990

Head coaching record

References

1937 births
Living people
Abilene Christian Wildcats men's basketball players
Alabama Crimson Tide men's basketball coaches
American members of the Churches of Christ
American men's basketball coaches
American men's basketball players
Basketball coaches from Alabama
Basketball players from Alabama
College men's basketball head coaches in the United States
Little Rock Trojans men's basketball coaches
North Alabama Lions men's basketball players
Sportspeople from Florence, Alabama